This is a list of Category A listed buildings in West Lothian, Scotland.

In Scotland, the term listed building refers to a building or other structure officially designated as being of "special architectural or historic interest". Category A structures are those considered to be "buildings of national or international importance, either architectural or historic, or fine little-altered examples of some particular period, style or building type." Listing was begun by a provision in the Town and Country Planning (Scotland) Act 1947, and the current legislative basis for listing is the Planning (Listed Buildings and Conservation Areas) (Scotland) Act 1997. The authority for listing rests with Historic Scotland, an executive agency of the Scottish Government, which inherited this role from the Scottish Development Department in 1991. Once listed, severe restrictions are imposed on the modifications allowed to a building's structure or its fittings. Listed building consent must be obtained from local authorities prior to any alteration to such a structure. There are approximately 47,400 listed buildings in Scotland, of which around 8% (some 3,800) are Category A.

There are 42 Category A listed buildings within the area, ranging from Linlithgow Palace, a principal residence of the Kings of Scotland, to more modest farms and cottages such as Gowanbank or Woodcockdale. Historic churches include those at Abercorn, Mid Calder and Linlithgow. Several small castles and tower houses merit Category A listing. More recent country houses include Hopetoun House, worked on successively by Sir William Bruce, William Adam and Robert Adam. A number of 19th century viaducts and aqueducts carry railways and canals across the River Avon and River Almond. In the historic royal burgh of Linlithgow, besides the palace and parish church, several town houses are listed at Category A. Few recent buildings in the area merit Category A listing, with only one building dating from the post-war period (Brucefield Church).

Listed buildings 

|}

See also
 Scheduled monuments in West Lothian

Notes

References

External links

West Lothian